Zaim Redžepović (born 4 September 1980) is a Serbian politician. An ethnic Bosniak, he was elected to the National Assembly of Serbia in the 2022 parliamentary election as a member of the Justice and Reconciliation Party (Stranka pravde i pomirenja, SPP).

Early life and career
Redžepović was born in Novi Pazar, in the Sandžak region of what was then the Socialist Republic of Serbia in the Socialist Federal Republic of Yugoslavia. He raised in nearby Tutin and later graduated from the University of Belgrade Faculty of Law.

Politician

Early years
Redžepović joined the Bosniak Democratic Union (Bošnjačka demokratska zajednica, BDZ) on its formation in 2010. He appeared in the second position on the party's electoral list for the Tutin municipal assembly in the 2012 Serbian local elections and was elected when the list won nine mandates, finishing second against the Party of Democratic Action of Sandžak (Stranka demokratske akcije Sandžaka, SDA Sandžak). The following year, the BDZ experienced a split between supporters of party leader Emir Elfić and Chief Mufti Muamer Zukorlić. Redžepović sided with Zukorlić, whose faction coalesced as the Bosniak Democratic Union of Sandžak (Bošnjačka demokratska zajednica Sandžaka, BDZ Sandžak) in late 2013.

The BDZ Sandžak contested the 2014 Serbian parliamentary election on the electoral list of the Liberal Democratic Party (Liberalno Demokratska Partija, LDP), and Redžepović was given the twenty-fifth position on the list. It did not cross the electoral threshold for assembly representation.

Redžepović again received the second position on his party's list for the 2016 local elections in Tutin and was re-elected when the BDZ Sandžak won six mandates. He also appeared in the fifth position on the party's list in the concurrent 2016 parliamentary election and was not elected when the list won two mandates.

Secretary of State
The Serbian Progressive Party (Srpska napredna stranka, SNS) and its allies won a majority victory in the 2016 parliamentary election. After the vote, the BDZ Sandžak provided outside support to Serbia's SNS-led administration. At Zukorlić's recommendation, Redžepović was appointed in October 2016 to a secretary of state position in the Serbian ministry of labour, employment, veterans affairs, and social policy. He resigned his seat in the municipal assembly two months later.

The BDZ Sandžak was reconstituted as the Justice and Reconciliation Party in 2017. The following year, Redžepović became the leader of the SPP's municipal board in Tutin. He appeared in the seventh position on Zukorlić's list in the 2018 election for the Bosniak National Council and was elected when the list won thirteen mandates; the list was narrowly defeated by a rival list affiliated with the SDA Sandžak.

Redžepović led the SPP's list in Tutin for the 2020 local elections and was elected to a third term when the list won eleven mandates. He also appeared in the eighth position on the party's list in the 2020 parliamentary election and missed election when the party won four mandates. The SPP again supported Serbia's SNS-led administration after the election, and in May 2021 Redžepović was appointed as a secretary of state in Serbia's ministry of agriculture, forestry, and water economy.

Parliamentarian
Zedžepović was promoted to the third position on the SPP's electoral list in the 2022 parliamentary election and was elected to the national assembly when the list won three mandates. He is now a deputy member of the assembly committee on human and minority rights and gender equality and the European Union–Serbia stabilization and association committee. He was chosen as a vice-president of the SPP in July 2022.

References

1980 births
Living people
Bosniaks of Serbia
Politicians from Novi Pazar
People from Tutin, Serbia
Members of the National Assembly (Serbia)
Members of the Bosniac National Council (Serbia)
Bosniak Democratic Union politicians
Bosniak Democratic Union of Sandžak politicians
Justice and Reconciliation Party politicians